Joseph Heller (May 1, 1923 – December 12, 1999) was an American author of novels, short stories, plays, and screenplays. His best-known work is the 1961 novel Catch-22, a satire on war and bureaucracy, whose title has become a synonym for an absurd or contradictory choice. He was nominated in 1972 for the Nobel Prize in Literature.

Early years
Heller was born on May 1, 1923 in Coney Island in Brooklyn, New York, the son of poor Jewish parents, Lena and Isaac Donald Heller, from Russia. Even as a child, he loved to write; as a teenager, he wrote a story about the Russian invasion of Finland and sent it to the New York Daily News, which rejected it. After graduating from Abraham Lincoln High School in 1941, Heller spent the next year working as a blacksmith's apprentice, a messenger boy, and a filing clerk.

In 1942, at age 19, he joined the U.S. Army Air Corps. Two years later he was sent to the Italian Front, where he flew 60 combat missions as a B-25 bombardier. His unit was the 488th Bombardment Squadron, 340th Bomb Group, 12th Air Force. Heller later remembered the war as "fun in the beginning ... You got the feeling that there was something glorious about it." On his return home he "felt like a hero ... People think it quite remarkable that I was in combat in an airplane and I flew sixty missions even though I tell them that the missions were largely milk runs."

After the war, Heller studied English at the University of Southern California and then New York University on the G.I. Bill, graduating from the latter institution in 1948. In 1949, he received his M.A. in English from Columbia University. Following his graduation from Columbia, he spent a year as a Fulbright scholar in St Catherine's College, Oxford before teaching composition at Pennsylvania State University for two years (1950–52). He then briefly worked for Time Inc., before taking a job as a copywriter at a small advertising agency, where he worked alongside future novelist Mary Higgins Clark. At home, Heller wrote. He was first published in 1948, when The Atlantic ran one of his short stories. The story nearly won the "Atlantic First".

He was married to Shirley Held from 1945 to 1981 and they had two children, Erica (born 1952) and Theodore (born 1956).

Career

Catch-22

While sitting at home one morning in 1953, Heller thought of the lines, "It was love at first sight. The first time he saw the chaplain, [Yossarian]  fell madly in love with him."  Within the next day, he began to envision the story that could result from this beginning, and invented the characters, the plot, and the tone that the story would eventually take. Within a week, he had finished the first chapter and sent it to his agent. He did not do any more writing for the next year, as he planned the rest of the story. The initial chapter was published in 1955 as "Catch-18", in Issue 7 of New World Writing.

Although he originally intended the story to be no longer than a novelette, Heller was able to add enough substance to the plot that he felt it could become his first novel. When he was one-third done with the work, his agent, Candida Donadio, sent it to publishers. Heller was not particularly attached to the work, and decided that he would not finish it if publishers were not interested. The work was soon purchased by Simon & Schuster, which gave him US$750 and promised him an additional $750 when the full manuscript was delivered. Heller missed his deadline by four to five years, but, after eight years of thought, delivered the novel to his publisher.

The finished novel describes the wartime experiences of Army Air Corps Captain John Yossarian. Yossarian devises multiple strategies to avoid combat missions, but the military bureaucracy is always able to find a way to make him stay. As Heller observed, "Everyone in my book accuses everyone else of being crazy. Frankly, I think the whole society is nuts – and the question is: What does a sane man do in an insane society?"

Just before publication, the novel's title was changed to Catch-22 to avoid confusion with Leon Uris' new novel, Mila 18. The novel was published in hardback in 1961 to mixed reviews, with the Chicago Sun-Times calling it "the best American novel in years", while other critics derided it as "disorganized, unreadable, and crass". It sold only 30,000 hardback copies in the United States  in its first year of publication. Reaction was very different in the UK, where, within one week of its publication, the novel was number one on the bestseller lists. In the years after its release in paperback in October 1962, however, Catch-22 caught the imaginations of many baby boomers, who identified with the novel's anti-war sentiments. The book went on to sell 10 million copies in the United States. The novel's title became a standard term in English and other languages for a dilemma with no easy way out. Now considered a classic, the book was listed at number 7 on Modern Library's list of the top 100 novels of the century. The United States Air Force Academy uses the novel to "help prospective officers recognize the dehumanizing aspects of bureaucracy."

The movie rights to the novel were purchased in 1962, and, combined with his royalties, made Heller a millionaire. The film, which was directed by Mike Nichols and starred Alan Arkin, Jon Voight and Orson Welles, was not released until 1970.

In April 1998, Lewis Pollock wrote to The Sunday Times for clarification as to "the amazing similarity of characters, personality traits, eccentricities, physical descriptions, personnel injuries and incidents" in Catch-22 and a novel published in England in 1951. The book that spawned the request was written by Louis Falstein and titled The Sky Is a Lonely Place in Britain and Face of a Hero in the United States. Falstein's novel was available two years before Heller wrote the first chapter of Catch-22 (1953). The Times stated: "Both have central characters who are using their wits to escape the aerial carnage; both are haunted by an omnipresent injured airman, invisible inside a white body cast". Stating he had never read Falstein's novel, or heard of him, Heller said: "My book came out in 1961[;] I find it funny that nobody else has noticed any similarities, including Falstein himself, who died just last year".

Other works

Other works by Heller are examples of modern satire which center on the lives of members of the middle class.

Shortly after Catch-22 was published, Heller thought of an idea for his next novel, which would become Something Happened, but did not act on it for two years. In the meantime he focused on scripts, completing the final screenplay for the movie adaptation of Helen Gurley Brown's Sex and the Single Girl, as well as a television comedy script that eventually aired as part of McHale's Navy.

In 1967, Heller wrote a play called We Bombed in New Haven. He completed the play in only six weeks, but spent a great deal of time working with the producers as it was brought to the stage. It delivered an anti-war message while discussing the Vietnam War. It was originally produced by the Repertory Company of the Yale Drama School, with Stacy Keach in the starring role. After a slight revision, it was published by Alfred A. Knopf and then debuted on Broadway, starring Jason Robards.

Heller's follow-up novel, Something Happened, was finally published in 1974. Critics were enthusiastic about the book, and both its hardcover and paperback editions reached number one on the New York Times bestseller list.
Heller wrote another five novels, each of which took him several years to complete. One of them, Closing Time, revisited many of the characters from Catch-22 as they adjusted to post-war New York. All of the novels sold respectably well, but could not duplicate the success of his first novel. Told by an interviewer that he had never produced anything else as good as Catch-22, Heller famously responded, "Who has?"

Work process
Heller did not begin work on a story until he had envisioned both a first and last line. The first sentence usually appeared to him "independent of any conscious preparation." In most cases, the sentence did not inspire a second sentence. At times, he would be able to write several pages before giving up on that hook. Usually, within an hour or so of receiving his inspiration, Heller would have mapped out a basic plot and characters for the story. When he was ready to begin writing, he focused on one paragraph at a time, until he had three or four handwritten pages, which he then spent several hours reworking.

Heller maintained that he did not "have a philosophy of life, or a need to organize its progression. My books are not constructed to 'say anything. Only when he was almost one-third finished with the novel would he gain a clear vision of what it should be about. At that point, with the idea solidified, he would rewrite all that he had finished and then continue to the end of the story. The finished version of the novel would often not begin or end with the sentences he had originally envisioned, although he usually tried to include the original opening sentence somewhere in the text.

Later teaching career
After the publication of Catch-22, Heller resumed a part-time academic career as an adjunct professor of creative writing at Yale University and the University of Pennsylvania. In the 1970s, Heller taught creative writing as a distinguished professor at the City College of New York.

Illness
On Sunday, December 13, 1981, Heller was diagnosed with Guillain–Barré syndrome, a debilitating syndrome that left him temporarily paralyzed. He was admitted to the Intensive Care Unit of Mount Sinai Medical Hospital the same day, and remained there, bedridden, until his condition had improved enough to permit his transfer to the Rusk Institute of Rehabilitation Medicine on January 26, 1982. His illness and recovery are recounted at great length in the autobiographical No Laughing Matter, which contains alternating chapters by Heller and his good friend Speed Vogel. The book describes the assistance and companionship Heller received during this period from a number of his prominent friends—Mel Brooks, Mario Puzo, Dustin Hoffman and George Mandel among them.

Heller eventually made a substantial recovery.  In 1987 he married Valerie Humphries, formerly one of his nurses.

Later years
Heller returned to St. Catherine's as a visiting Fellow, for a term, in 1991 and was appointed an Honorary Fellow of the college. In 1998, he released a memoir, Now and Then: From Coney Island to Here, in which he relived his childhood as the son of a deliveryman and offered some details about the inspirations for Catch-22.

Heller was an agnostic.

He died of a heart attack at his home in East Hampton, on Long Island, in December 1999, shortly after the completion of his final novel, Portrait of an Artist, as an Old Man. On hearing of Heller's death, his friend Kurt Vonnegut said, "Oh, God, how terrible. This is a calamity for American literature."

Works

Novels
 Catch-22 (1961)
 Something Happened (1974)
 Good as Gold (1979)
 God Knows (1984)
 Picture This (1988)
 Closing Time (1994)
 Portrait of an Artist, as an Old Man (2000, posthumous)

Short stories
 “Love, Dad” (1969)
 “Yossarian Survives” (1987)
 "The Day Bush Left" (1990)
 Catch as Catch Can: The Collected Stories and Other Writings (2003, posthumous)
 "Almost Like Christmas" (2013, posthumous)

Plays
 We Bombed in New Haven (1967)
 Catch-22 (1973)
 Clevinger’s Trial (1973)

Screenplays
 Sex and the Single Girl (1964)
 Casino Royale (1967) (uncredited)
 Dirty Dingus Magee (1970)

Teleplay
 McHale's Navy, episode four, "PT 73, Where Are You?" (1962)

Autobiographies
  No Laughing Matter (1986)
  Now And Then  (1998)

Reviews
 Lindsay, Frederic (1975), review of Something Happened, in Burnett, Ray (ed.), Calgacus 2, Summer 1975, pp. 59 & 60,

References
Notes

Bibliography

External links

 Joseph Heller papers at the University of South Carolina Department of Rare Books and Special Collections
 Collection of Joseph Heller manuscripts and speeches at the University of South Carolina Department of Rare Books and Special Collections
 Sylvia Heller Gurian papers at the University of South Carolina Department of Rare Books and Special Collections
 Transcript of conversation with Ramona Koval, ABC Radio National, recorded 1998 and rebroadcast on The Book Show, June 9, 2008
 Joseph Heller's Penn State University historical marker 
 
 
 
 

1923 births
1999 deaths
20th-century American novelists
Abraham Lincoln High School (Brooklyn) alumni
Alumni of St Catherine's College, Oxford
American agnostics
American male novelists
United States Army Air Forces personnel of World War II
American people of Russian-Jewish descent
American satirical novelists
American satirists
Columbia Graduate School of Arts and Sciences alumni
American copywriters
Jewish agnostics
Jewish American dramatists and playwrights
Jewish American novelists
Pennsylvania State University faculty
Writers from Brooklyn
Prix Médicis étranger winners
United States Army Air Forces officers
American male short story writers
20th-century American dramatists and playwrights
American male dramatists and playwrights
20th-century American short story writers
20th-century American male writers
Novelists from New York (state)
Novelists from Pennsylvania
20th-century American non-fiction writers
American male non-fiction writers
People with Guillain–Barré syndrome
American expatriates in the United Kingdom
Members of the American Academy of Arts and Letters
Fulbright alumni